Caan or CAAN may refer to:

 Caan (name), a family name (includes a list of people with this surname)
 Caan, Germany, municipality in Rhineland-Palatinate
 Civil Aviation Authority of Nepal
 Consenting Adult Action Network

See also 
 Kahn, a surname
 Khan (disambiguation)
 Kaan (disambiguation)
 Kan (disambiguation)